The eighteenth season of Saturday Night Live, an American sketch comedy series, originally aired in the United States on NBC between September 26, 1992, and May 15, 1993.

Cast
Many changes happened before the start of the season. Long-term cast member Victoria Jackson left the show after six seasons. Newer cast members Beth Cahill and Siobhan Fallon were both fired. Lorne Michaels did not hire any new cast members. Rob Schneider was upgraded to repertory status. Ellen Cleghorne, Tim Meadows, Adam Sandler and David Spade remained in the middle category. Melanie Hutsell was promoted to the middle category and Robert Smigel stayed a featured player.

Long-term cast member Dana Carvey would leave mid-season. This would also be the final season for cast members Chris Rock and Robert Smigel. 

After three years with the show, Chris Rock decided to quit the show at the end of the season (he had become frustrated with never quite finding a voice on the show and wanted to instead focus on his stand-up career). Writer and featured player Robert Smigel left to become the head writer for Late Night with Conan O'Brien, but would later return to the show in 1996 to write and produce the "TV Funhouse" cartoons..

This season was also home to one of SNLs most infamous moments: Sinéad O'Connor tore a photograph of Pope John Paul II at the end of her second singing performance.

Cast roster

Repertory players
Dana Carvey (final episode: February 6, 1993)
Chris Farley
Phil Hartman
Mike Myers (on leave until December 5, 1992)
Kevin Nealon
Chris Rock
Rob Schneider
Julia Sweeney

Featured players
Ellen Cleghorne
Melanie Hutsell
Tim Meadows
Adam Sandler
David Spade

With
Al Franken
Robert Smigel

bold denotes Weekend Update anchor

Writers

Episodes

Specials

Coneheads film
Coneheads, a film based on the popular Coneheads sketches that appeared on the show in the 1970s, was released on July 23, 1993. Cast members Dan Aykroyd, Peter Aykroyd, Jane Curtin, Chris Farley, Phil Hartman, Jan Hooks, Jon Lovitz, Michael McKean, Tim Meadows, Garret Morris, Kevin Nealon, Laraine Newman, Adam Sandler, David Spade, and Julia Sweeney all appear in the film. The film did not do well at the box office and was largely panned by critics.

References

18
Saturday Night Live in the 1990s
1992 American television seasons
1993 American television seasons